Muhammad Ahsan Ali Khan (born December 13, 1990) is a Pakistani-born American professional cricketer.

Early life 
Ali Khan was born and raised in Attock in Pakistan. At the age of 19, his family moved to the United States, settling in Ohio.

International career
He made his List A debut in January 2016, playing for the ICC Americas team in the 2015–16 Regional Super50. On debut against Jamaica, he took the wickets of Devon Thomas and Aldane Thomas, finishing with 2/63 from ten overs. Khan was the only member of the ICC Americas squad to have not previously played for his national team. In July 2016 he was one of eleven uncapped players to be named for a USA selection camp ahead of the 2016 ICC World Cricket League Division Four tournament in October.

In August 2018, he was named in the United States' squad for the 2018–19 ICC World Twenty20 Americas Qualifier tournament in Morrisville, North Carolina. In October 2018, he was named in the United States' squad for the 2018 ICC World Cricket League Division Three tournament in Oman.

The International Cricket Council (ICC) named Khan as one of the five breakout stars in men's cricket in 2018 and in February 2019 he was named in the United States' Twenty20 International (T20I) squad for their series against the United Arab Emirates, but did not play due to injury concerns. The matches were the first T20I fixtures to be played by the United States cricket team.

In April 2019, he was named in the United States cricket team's squad for the 2019 ICC World Cricket League Division Two tournament in Namibia. In the United States' second match of the tournament, against hosts Namibia, Khan took his first five-wicket haul in List A cricket. He took five wickets for 63 runs from his ten overs, and was named the player of the match. The United States finished in the top four places in the tournament, therefore gaining One Day International (ODI) status. Khan made his ODI debut for the United States on April 27, 2019, against Papua New Guinea, in the tournament's third-place playoff. He was the leading wicket-taker in the tournament, with 17 dismissals in six matches.

In June 2019, he was named in a 30-man training squad for the United States cricket team, ahead of the Regional Finals of the 2018–19 ICC T20 World Cup Americas Qualifier tournament in Bermuda. Later the same month, he was selected to play for the Vancouver Knights franchise team in the 2019 Global T20 Canada tournament. In August 2019, he was named in the United States' squad for the Regional Finals of the 2018–19 ICC T20 World Cup Americas Qualifier tournament.

In October 2021, he was named in the American Twenty20 International (T20I) squad for the 2021 ICC Men's T20 World Cup Americas Qualifier tournament in Antigua. He made his T20I debut on 7 November 2021, for the United States against Panama.

Franchise career
On June 3, 2018, he was selected to play for the Winnipeg Hawks in the players' draft for the inaugural edition of the Global T20 Canada tournament.
In October 2018, he was named in the squad for the Khulna Titans team, following the draft for the 2018–19 Bangladesh Premier League.

On March 15, 2020, he debuted for Karachi Kings against Quetta Gladiators and conceded 1/36 in his 3 overs.

During the 2019 Caribbean Premier League, Ali Khan was fined for an incident in the match between the Trinbago Knight Riders and St Kitts & Nevis Patriots, where he was involved in a heated exchange with batsman Evin Lewis. In July 2020, he was named in the Trinbago Knight Riders squad for the 2020 Caribbean Premier League. He was added to the Houston Hurricanes for the 2021 Minor League Cricket season.

References

External links
 

1990 births
Living people
American cricketers
United States One Day International cricketers
United States Twenty20 International cricketers
Pakistani emigrants to the United States
American sportspeople of Pakistani descent
Cricketers from Attock
Sportspeople from Ohio
Guyana Amazon Warriors cricketers
ICC Americas cricketers
Trinbago Knight Riders cricketers
Kabul Zwanan cricketers
Khulna Tigers cricketers
Karachi Kings cricketers